In Irish and Scottish mythology, the banshee is a "fairy woman" whose mournful wail heralds an imminent death.

Banshee may also refer to:

Computing
Banshee (media player), a cross-platform open-source media player
Voodoo Banshee, a video card by 3Dfx

Fiction
Banshee (character), a superhero in Marvel Comics
"Banshee" (short story), a 1984 autobiographical short story by Ray Bradbury
Silver Banshee, a DC Comics character
Banshees, large flightless blind carnivorous birds in Marion Zimmer Bradley's Darkover series

Film and television
Banshee (film), a 2006 TV movie by Kari Skogland
Banshee (TV series), an American action television series
Mountain Banshee, a flying animal in the film Avatar
 The Banshees of Inisherin, 2022 film sometimes informally called Banshees

Music
Banshee (band), a melodic power metal band from the 1980s American Midwest
The Banshee (band), an indie-new wave band from Genova
The Banshees (band), an American garage rock band
Banshee (album), a 2016 album by The Cave Singers
Siouxsie and the Banshees, a British rock band
The Banshee (composition), a musical piece by American composer Henry Cowell
"Banshee", an instrumental track by Irish band Thin Lizzy on their 1974 album Nightlife
"Banshee", a song by American electronic singer Santigold on her 2016 album 99¢
"The Banshee", a song by Serbian band Orthodox Celts on their 2017 album Many Mouths Shut!

Vehicles
Banshee (dinghy), an American cat-rigged, one-design, sailing dinghy design
HMS Banshee (1894), a Banshee class destroyer
International Ultralite Banchee, ultralight aircraft
McDonnell F2H Banshee, a military fighter aircraft
Pontiac Banshee, a concept car
Yamaha Banshee 350, a high-performance all-terrain vehicle
Meggitt BTT-3 Banshee, a remotely piloted vehicle (aerial target system) developed by Meggitt Defence Systems
A-24 Banshee, USAAF equivalent of the SBD Dauntless dive bomber

Video games
Banshee (video game), a 1994 Amiga shoot 'em up video game

Other
Banshee (roller coaster), a steel roller coaster located at Kings Island amusement park in Mason, Ohio

See also